The Cincinnati Stingers were an ice hockey team based in Cincinnati that played in the World Hockey Association from 1975 to 1979 and in the Central Hockey League during the 1979–80 season. Their home arena was Riverfront Coliseum. They are the only major league hockey team to have played in Cincinnati.

History
The Stingers franchise was awarded in 1974 as part of the WHA's ill-conceived attempt at expansion. They entered the league for the 1975–76 WHA season along with the Denver Spurs. Most of the league's existing teams were not financially stable, and franchise relocations were commonplace. The Stingers achieved enough stability that they were the only one of the WHA's five expansion teams that lasted through to the end of the league, but they were left out of the NHL–WHA merger in mid-1979. The WHA insisted on including all three of its surviving Canadian teams, though below-average attendance made it unlikely that the Stingers would have made the cut. The Stingers, along with the Birmingham Bulls, were paid to disband when the WHA ceased operations.

The Stingers were the first professional team of long-time NHL stars Mike Gartner and Mike Liut, and the second pro team for Mark Messier, who scored one goal on a line with Robbie Ftorek, one of the league's top scorers.

After the WHA shut down, a minor professional version of the Cincinnati Stingers began the 1979–80 season in the Central Hockey League (CHL). The CHL team included only three players from the 1978–79 WHA Stingers; Dave Debol, Byron Shutt and Paul Stewart, but disbanded 33 games into the season.

The last Cincinnati Stingers player active in North American major professional hockey was Mark Messier, who retired in 2004.

Hockey Hall of Fame members

Mike Gartner
Mark Messier

Season-by-season record
Note: GP = Games played, W = Wins, L = Losses, T = Ties, Pts = Points, GF = Goals for, GA = Goals against, PIM = Penalties in minutes

World Hockey Association

Central Hockey League

See also
List of Cincinnati Stingers players

References

External links
Cincinnati Stingers

 
Defunct ice hockey teams in Ohio
Ice hockey clubs established in 1975
Ice hockey clubs disestablished in 1979
World Hockey Association teams
Sports teams in Cincinnati
Central Professional Hockey League teams
1975 establishments in Ohio
1979 disestablishments in Ohio